Fontenille-Saint-Martin-d'Entraigues is a commune in the Deux-Sèvres department in the Nouvelle-Aquitaine region in western France.

Geography
The main hamlets in the commune are located on the banks of the river Boutonne, which flows southwestward through the commune.

See also
Communes of the Deux-Sèvres department

References

Communes of Deux-Sèvres